Schildhauer is a surname. Notable people with the surname include:

Edward Schildhauer (1872–1953), chief engineer on the Panama Canal project
Werner Schildhauer  (born 1959), retired German athlete

German-language surnames
Occupational surnames